The Goldring/Woldenberg Institute of Southern Jewish Life (ISJL) is a non-profit Jewish organization serving a thirteen-state southern region. Based in Jackson, Mississippi, the ISJL provides programming throughout the South.

Overview

Mission: The Goldring/Woldenberg Institute of Southern Jewish Life (ISJL) supports, connects, and celebrates Jewish life in the South.

Structure: The ISJL has three core service areas - Education, Culture, and Spirituality. The ISJL serves a thirteen-state region that includes Alabama, Arkansas, Florida, Georgia, Kentucky, Louisiana, Mississippi, North Carolina, Oklahoma, South Carolina, Tennessee, Texas, and Virginia.

History: began as the Museum of the Southern Jewish Experience in 1986. The Museum, which now exists as a separate New Orleans-based entity, was formed as a response to an outcry from small-town southern Jews in need of a repository for artifacts, sacred objects, historical documents, and stories. The ISJL remains committed to supporting the museum efforts, and ensuring that the stories and impact of the southern Jewish community will not be forgotten. But the story of Southern Jewish life is not merely a story of shuttering synagogues and diminishing numbers. It's also a story of growing communities, vibrant congregations, and active Jewish communities of all sizes. Thus, in 2000, we became the Goldring/Woldenberg Institute of Southern Jewish Life, and now focus on connecting communities throughout the region through our Education, Culture, and Spirituality resources. We also work with partners including libraries and public schools to provide dynamic secular literacy programming.

See also
History of the Jews in the United States
History of the Jews in Charleston, South Carolina
Jewish education
Culture of the Southern United States
History of the Southern United States

References

External links
 Goldring/Woldenberg Institute of Southern Jewish Life (official site)
ISJL Encyclopedia of Southern Jewish Communities
 ISJL Weekly Taste of Torah
 ISJL Museum of the Southern Jewish Experience
 Jewish Cinema South
 Southern States Jewish Literary Series
 "Always Miles to Go for Rabbi With 28 Temples in 12 States," The New York Times, 26 Nov. 2005

Jewish community organizations
Jewish educational organizations
Jewish history organizations
Jewish outreach
Educational organizations based in the United States
Jewish organizations based in the United States
Jewish-American history
Jews and Judaism in Mississippi
Non-profit organizations based in Mississippi
Culture of Jackson, Mississippi
Jewish organizations established in 2000
2000 establishments in Mississippi